art + soul is an Australian cultural project, led by curator Hetti Perkins, that aims to convey the diversity and complexity of Indigenous expression in Australia.  The project spans three mediums: an ABC documentary series, an exhibition at the Art Gallery of NSW, and an accompanying book published by the Miegunyah Press.

The three-part documentary was directed by Warwick Thornton, and first aired on ABC on 7 October 2010.  It has been described as "groundbreaking."  Each part explores Australian Indigenous art, culture and heritage according to a certain theme: home + away; dreams + nightmares; and bitter + sweet.

Exhibition
The art + soul exhibition ran from 28 August 2010 until 13 June 2011 in the Yiribana gallery at the Art Gallery of NSW.  It features works from the gallery's own Aboriginal art collection.

Book
The art + soul book was published by the Miegunyah Press, and released to coincide with the exhibition and series.

References

 
 
 Blundell, Graeme (2 October 2010). "Joining the dots". The Australian. Accessed 29 October 2015.

Arts organisations based in Australia
Documentary films about Aboriginal Australians